Mats Ericson (born 20 September 1964) is a Swedish former alpine skier who competed in the 1992 Winter Olympics and 1994 Winter Olympics.

External links
 sports-reference.com

1964 births
Living people
Swedish male alpine skiers
Olympic alpine skiers of Sweden
Alpine skiers at the 1992 Winter Olympics
Alpine skiers at the 1994 Winter Olympics
Place of birth missing (living people)
20th-century Swedish people